Aesara of Lucania ( Aisara; 4th or 3rd century BC) was a Pythagorean philosopher who wrote On Human Nature, of which a fragment is preserved by Stobaeus.

Life
Aesara is known only from a one-page fragment of her philosophical work titled On Human Nature preserved by Stobaeus. Lucania, where she came from, was an ancient district of southern Italy and part of Magna Graecia where many Pythagorean communities existed. Aesara is counted among the Pythagoreans who were scattered after their expulsion from Crotona in the 5th century BC. It has been conjectured that her name is a variation on the name Aresa, who, according to one minor tradition, was a daughter of Pythagoras and Theano. A male writer from Lucania called Aresas is also mentioned by Iamblichus in his Life of Pythagoras.

Work
On Human Nature is written in the Doric prose characteristic of the 3rd century BC or earlier, although that doesn't preclude the possibility that it was written later in an archaic style. It has been argued that the fragment is a Neopythagorean forgery dating from the Roman era. Even so, this at least implies that there was an earlier Pythagorean called Aesara of Lucania worth imitating. It has also been suggested that the fragment is pseudonymous and comes from a textbook produced by one of the dissenting successor schools to Archytas of Tarentum in Italy in the 4th or 3rd century BC. In the absence of any strong evidence supporting either hypothesis, there is no reason to suppose that the fragment was not written by a woman philosopher called Aesara in the 4th or 3rd centuries BC.

Aesara argues that it is by studying our own human nature (and specifically the human soul) that we can understand the philosophical basis for natural law and morality:
Human nature seems to me to provide a standard of law and justice both for the home and for the city.
Aesara divides the soul into three parts: the mind which performs judgement and thought, the spirit which contains courage and strength, and desire which provides love and friendliness:
Being threefold, it is organized in accordance with triple functions: that which effects judgment and thoughtfulness is [the mind], that which effects strength and ability is [high spirit], and that which effects love and kindliness is desire.
These things, being divine, are the rational, mathematical, and functional principles at work in the soul. Aesara's theory of natural law concerns three applications of morality, concerning the individual, the family, and social institutions.

The Pythagoreans were notable as a sect for including women in their ranks. This did not necessarily equate to modern ideas of equality; they believed that women were responsible for creating harmony and justice in the home, in the same way that men had the same responsibility towards the state. Seen in this context, Aesara's theory of natural law is fundamental to justice and harmony in society as a whole.

See also
Oresas

Notes

References

External links
Aesara of Lucania at Women-philosophers.com

4th-century BC philosophers
Pythagoreans
Ancient Greek women philosophers
Ancient Greek women writers
4th-century BC women writers
4th-century BC writers
3rd-century BC women writers
3rd-century BC writers
Doric Greek writers
Lucanian Greeks
People from Basilicata
Pythagoreans of Magna Graecia
Year of birth unknown
Year of death unknown
3rd-century BC Greek women
4th-century BC Greek women